The 2003 U.S. Men's Clay Court Championships was a men's tennis tournament played on outdoor clay courts at the Westside Tennis Club in Houston, Texas in the United States and was part of the International Series of the 2003 ATP Tour. It was the 35th edition of the tournament and ran from April 21 through April 27, 2003. First-seeded Andre Agassi won the singles title.

Finals

Singles

 Andre Agassi defeated  Andy Roddick 3–6, 6–3, 6–4
 It was Agassi's 4th title of the year and the 59th of his career.

Doubles

 Mark Knowles /  Daniel Nestor defeated  Jan-Michael Gambill /  Graydon Oliver 6–4, 6–3
 It was Knowles's 3rd title of the year and the 27th of his career. It was Nestor's 3rd title of the year and the 29th of his career.

References

External links
 Official website
 ATP tournament profile

 
U.S. Men's Clay Court Championships
U.S. Men's Clay Court Championships
U.S. Men's Clay Court Championships
U.S. Men's Clay Court Championships
U.S. Men's Clay Court Championships